Bilambil is a town located in north-eastern New South Wales, Australia, in the Tweed Shire.

Demographics

78.5% of people living in Bilambil were born in Australia. The other top responses for country of birth were England (4.8%), New Zealand (3.8%), United States of America (0.9%), Scotland (0.7%), Netherlands (0.7%), and other countries (10.9%).

91.4% of people spoke only English at home, with Maltese (0.7%), Dutch (0.5%), Italian (0.5%), Greek (0.5%), and other languages (2.2%) also being reported.

Sport and recreation 
A number of well-known sporting teams represent the local area, including the Bilambil Jets, the rugby league club who play home games at Bilambil Sports Complex which is located in Bilambil Road Bilambil NSW. Bilambil Terranora soccer club play in Football Queensland South Coast competitions, despite being based in New South Wales.

See also

References 

Suburbs of Tweed Heads, New South Wales